Japanese Winter Olympics may refer to:

1972 Winter Olympics in Sapporo, Hokkaidō Prefecture
1998 Winter Olympics in Nagano, Nagano Prefecture